Christopher C. Bell Jr. (born May 7, 1933) is an American writer, African American author, poet, and lecturer. Bell is best known for his controversial writings on racial issues in the Black church that cause the "White Superiority Syndrome" which is a term he coined. He's a founder of the Muslim American Veterans Association (MAVA).

Life
Bell was born and raised in Campostella, a small suburb of Norfolk, Virginia. He is a retired Major of the U.S. Army. He co-founded the Muslim American Veterans Association in 1997 and later became a Unitarian Universalist and humanist. He retired in Clinton, Maryland, which is in Prince George's County.

Works
His first book Soldiers Do Reason Why . . . published January 19, 1998, is a book of poems he wrote when he was in the military.

His next book, Lt Williams on the Color Front published June 10, 2005, is a fiction story about a platoon leader in an all-white Army Infantry Regiment in Germany. This has some basis in his own life as he was a lieutenant in the 1950s.

The Belief Factor and the White Superiority Syndrome, published January 19, 1998, preceded his more recent book The Black Clergy's Misguided Worship Leadership, are both non-fiction books intended for African-American leaders to stop preaching the Biblical story of Jesus since Jesus is always depicted as white or light-skinned which is unhealthy to the black psyche, according to his theory.

References

External links
 Christopher C. Bell Jr. – author's site

Living people
1933 births
Writers from Norfolk, Virginia
African-American non-fiction writers
21st-century American male writers
21st-century American non-fiction writers
American male non-fiction writers
21st-century African-American writers
20th-century African-American people
African-American male writers